The Hillbank station is located in Hillbank, British Columbia. The station was a flag stop on Via Rail's Dayliner service. The line and station closed in 2011 due to poor track conditions.

References 

Via Rail stations in British Columbia
Disused railway stations in Canada